The 1919–20 season was Beşiktaş' first official football season. They competed with 11 other teams in the İstanbul Sports League. They finished first place, winning their first ever official league championship.

Season

External links
http://www.angelfire.com/nj/sivritepe/5758/artlIST.html

Beşiktaş J.K. seasons
Besiktas